Perameles bowensis is an extinct Pliocene-aged species of bandicoot. Fossils have been found in the Wellington Caves of New South Wales. The bandicoot was about 20 centimeters long. It is believed to have gone extinct in the Late Pliocene.

It is probably most closely related to P. sobbei, a Pleistocene-aged bandicoot from Queensland.

References

Peramelemorphs
Marsupials of Australia
Mammals of New South Wales
Pliocene marsupials
Pliocene mammals of Australia
Pliocene first appearances
Zanclean extinctions
Fossil taxa described in 1997